Uncertain Pleasures is an album by the Irish singer Mary Coughlan. It was released in 1990 by East West Records. Coughlan did not like the album as she felt that too much was dictated by her label.

Track listing 

 "Man of the World" (Pete Glenister)
 "I Can Dream Can't I" (Irving Kahal, Sammy Fain)
 "Whiskey Didn't Kill the Pain" (John Duhan)
 "Leaf From a Tree" (Mark E. Nevin)
 "The Little Death" (Bob Geldof, Pete Briquette)
 "Invisible to You" (Pete Glenister, Scott Wilk)
 "I Get Along Without You Very Well" (Hoagy Carmichael)
 "Heartbreak Hotel" (Elvis Presley, Mae Boren Axton, Tommy Durden)
 "Red Ribbon" (Mark E. Nevin)
 "Mother's Little Helper" (Mick Jagger, Keith Richards)

Personnel 
 Mary Coughlan – vocals
 Guy Barker – trumpet (5)
 Conor Barry – guitar (2,3,5,8)
 Pete Glenister – guitar (1–3,5–7,9,10); bass programming (1)
 Christian Marsac – guitar (6,10)
 Mark E Nevin – guitar (4,9)
 Bob Andrew – keyboards (1–3,5,6,8,10)
 Richie Buckley – soprano saxophone (8)
 Gavin Povey – accordion (9)
 Roger Beaujolais – glockenspiel (4)
 Helen O'Hara – violin (9)
 Pat Collins – violin (1,10)
 Simon Edwards – double bass (4,9)
 John McKenzie – bass (3,5,6,10)
 Danny Thompson – bass (1,2,7,8)
 Neil Conti – drums (tracks 1,6,8,10); brushes (5)
 Blair Cunningham – drums (3)
 Roy Dodds – drums (4,9)
 Jeff Dunn – drums (5)
 Phil Overhead – percussion (1,3,5,6,9,10); drums (2)
 Frank Collins – backing vocals (1)
 Fran Kapelle – backing vocals (5,9,10)
 Kirsty MacColl – backing vocals (6)
 Ebo Ross – backing vocals (1)
 Nigel Rush – backing vocals (1)
 Violet Williams – backing vocals (5,9,10)

References

Mary Coughlan (singer) albums
1990 albums
East West Records albums